McAlister is a northern Irish and Scottish surname. It is derived from the Gaelic Mac Alasdair, meaning "son of Alasdair". The personal name Alasdair is a Gaelic form of Alexander.

People with the surname
 Barbara McAlister (diver) ( 1962), American diver
 Barbara McAlister (mezzo-soprano) (born 1941), Cherokee-American mezzo-soprano opera singer
 Chris McAlister (born 1977), American football cornerback
 Daniel McAlister (born 1978), Australian rules footballer
 Fred McAlister (1928–2008), American baseball player
 Hill McAlister (1875–1959), American politician
 Jim McAlister (American soccer) (born 1957), American soccer defender
 Jim McAlister (Scottish footballer) (born 1985), Scottish footballer
 John McAlister (1842–1918), Canadian politician
 Ken McAlister (born 1960), American football player
 Luke McAlister (born 1983), New Zealand rugby union footballer
 Mary McAlister (1896–1976), Scottish nurse
 Peter McAlister (1869–1938), Australian cricketer
 Michael McAlister (born 1976), NOAA Hurricane Hunters
 Walter Robert McAlister (1931–1993), Canadian minister

Fictional characters 
 McKeyla McAlister, from the Netflix original series Project Mc²
John Peter McAlister, Korean War Veteran and ninja master, from the NBC show, The Master (American TV series)

See also
Macalister
Clan MacAlister
McAlester (disambiguation), includes list of people with surname McAlester
McAllister (surname), surname

References